Azorella filamentosa is a species of flowering plant in the genus Azorella existing in Chile and the Falkland Islands.

References

External links
 Azorella filamentosa at Plants for a Future.org.

filamentosa
Flora of Chile